Deer Flat Upper Embankment (National ID # ID00276) is a dam in the western United States in southwestern Idaho. Located in the Treasure Valley in Canyon County, it is directly southwest of Nampa.

The Upper Embankment is the largest of a set of four dikes here impounding the water of the Boise River in offstream storage. The other dams are:

The Boise Project was among the first undertaken by the Reclamation Service after its formation in 1902. Shortly before leaving office, President Theodore Roosevelt created a national bird refuge at Deer Flat Reservoir, now Lake Lowell, with an executive order on February 25, 1909. The refuge was one of 17 federal reclamation projects referenced in the order, each of which used manmade aquifers to provide safe havens for migratory birds. The effort to include the Canyon County site was spearheaded by James H. Lowell, the president of the local Payette-Boise Water Users Association.

The "globally important" Deer Flat National Wildlife Refuge for migratory fowl and other wildlife consists of two sections which contains open water, edge wetlands, grasslands and riparian and forest habitats. The largest portion of the refuge consists of Lake Lowell and its environs. The second portion comprises the Snake River islands located in non-contiguous localities along the river in Canyon, Owyhee, Payette, and Washington counties (Idaho) and Malheur and Baker counties (Oregon). The visitors' center on the northern Lake Lowell shoreline is the hub of activity for visitors and those volunteers who donate their time and services to wildlife conservation projects.

See also

New York Canal

References

External links

Buildings and structures in Canyon County, Idaho
Dams on the National Register of Historic Places in Idaho
Historic American Engineering Record in Idaho
Reservoirs in Idaho
United States Bureau of Reclamation dams
Dams completed in 1908
Lakes of Canyon County, Idaho
Boise Project
National Register of Historic Places in Canyon County, Idaho
1908 establishments in Idaho